Deadwater railway station is a closed railway station situated on the border between England and Scotland at the head of the North Tyne River. The station served the settlement of Deadwater which consisted of just six houses.

History

Deadwater railway station was on the Border Counties Railway which linked the Newcastle and Carlisle Railway, near Hexham, with the Border Union Railway at Riccarton Junction. The first section of the route was opened between Hexham and Chollerford in 1858, the remainder opening in 1862. The line was closed to passengers by British Railways in 1956.

The station had a single platform, a stone built station building, and a siding that crossed the border which was just north of the station proper.

The station building and platform still stand.

References

External links
Deadwater Station on Disused Stations
Deadwater Station on Northumbrian Railways
Deadwater Station on a navigable 1955 O.S. map

Disused railway stations in Northumberland
Former North British Railway stations
Railway stations in Great Britain opened in 1880
Railway stations in Great Britain closed in 1958